Cory Steven Blaser  (born December 8, 1981) is an American Major League Baseball umpire. He umpired his first major league game on April 24, 2010.

Umpiring career 
Blaser is a graduate of Pomona High School and attended Colorado State University. He had previously worked in the Arizona League Northwest League, Midwest League Carolina League Eastern League Florida Instructional League, and Arizona Instructional League. Blaser attended the Harry Wendelstedt Umpire School, and works as an instructor there in the off-season.

Blaser was officially named to the full-time MLB staff prior to the 2014 season. His uniform number is 89.

Blaser worked his first career MLB postseason game in right field on October 7, 2015, serving in the 2015 National League Wild Card Game between the Chicago Cubs and the Pittsburgh Pirates.

See also 

 List of Major League Baseball umpires

References

External links 
Retrosheet
The Baseball Cube
Close Call Sports

1981 births
Living people
Major League Baseball umpires
Sportspeople from Denver